The Torres Gonzalo Jiménez de Quesada ("Gonzalo Jiménez de Quesada Towers") is a residential complex composed of five towers of equal height in the centre of the Colombian capital Bogotá. The buildings are situated in the neighbourhood (barrio) Las Aguas, in the northeast of La Candelaria.

Etymology 
The towers are named after the Spanish conquistador Gonzalo Jiménez de Quesada, who after the expedition into the Andes and conquest of the Muisca was the first governor of the New Kingdom of Granada and the founder of Bogotá on August 6, 1538.

Description 
The Torres Gonzalo Jiménez de Quesada were constructed as part of the urbanization project in the late 1960s and 1970s. They are locates in the centre of Bogotá; the locality La Candelaria. The complex of the five residential towers, each  in height, consists of 390 apartments, next to the Universidad de los Andes. The towers are the highest buildings in the historical centre of the Colombian capital.

At the base of the towers, a mural has been drawn.

See also 

 Gonzalo Jiménez de Quesada
 BD Bacatá

References

Bibliography

External links 

Buildings and structures in Bogotá